The 7th Macho de Monte Infantry Company was an elite infantry battalion of the Panama Defense Forces. Its mascot was the Baird's tapir, from which the company took it name, as in Panama the tapir is called 'Macho de Monte' which translates as 'mountain men'. It was based at the Base Militar "General de Division Omar Torrijos Herrera" in Rio Hato and specialised in guerrilla warfare.

It was disbanded alongside the rest of the Panama Defense Forces on December 20, 1989, following the United States invasion of Panama.

History
The 7th Macho de Monte Infantry Company was founded on April 7, 1969, as part of the National Guard of Panama by General Omar Torrijos who had seized power in a coup in 1968. The unit's first leader was Ediberto del Cid who had supported Torrijos. Following Manuel Noriega's seizure of power and transformation of the National Guard into the Panama Defense Forces in 1983 the unit was built into an elite infantry battalion.

During the 1989 Panamanian coup d'état attempt the company sided with Noriega and were deployed by air to Panama City to quell the coup attempt and to dislodge the entrenched rebels from the Central Barracks. Their performance during the coup attempt showed the unit to be one of Noriega's most loyal and as a result it became a commando and special forces unit specialising in guerilla warfare in case of US intervention.

The battalion, along with the whole of the Panama Defense Forces, was disbanded on December 20, 1989, following the US invasion of Panama. During the invasion the battalion took part in the Battle of Rio Hato Airfield. The battle lasted for 5 hours and featured room-to-room combat as United States Army Rangers attempted to secure the Rio Hato military base.

Structure
The 7th Macho de Monte Infantry Company was structured as follows:

Headquarters
3 Rifle Platoons
1 Inner Guard Platoon
1 Mortar Section

Special sections 
1 Commandos
1 Frogmen Section
1 Explosives Section
1 Pana-Jungle Section
1 Motorized Section - "Cocuyos Montaneros"

References

Military history of Panama
Units of the Panama Defense Forces